Bartolomeo Lopaci, O.P. was a Roman Catholic prelate who served as Bishop of Coron (1449–1457) and Bishop of Cortona (1439–1449).

Biography
Bartolomeo Lopaci was ordained a priest in the Order of Preachers. On 23 September 1439, he was appointed during the papacy of Pope Eugene IV as Bishop of Cortona. On 27 June 1449, he was appointed during the papacy of Pope Nicholas V as Bishop of Coron. He served as Bishop of Coron until his resignation in 1457. While bishop, he was the principal co-consecrator of Antonio de Pago, Bishop of Ossero.

References

External links and additional sources
 (for Chronology of Bishops) 
 (for Chronology of Bishops) 

15th-century Roman Catholic bishops in the Republic of Venice
Bishops appointed by Pope Eugene IV
Bishops appointed by Pope Nicholas V
Dominican bishops